Sebastiano Folli (1568–1621) was an Italian painter of the late Renaissance period. He was a scholar of Alessandro Casolano, and a native of Siena. He distinguished himself by several frescoes in the churches at Siena, particularly the cupola of Santa Marta, and some subjects from the Life of St. Sebastian, in the church of that saint, painted in competition with Rutilio Manetti, to whose pictures they are in no way inferior. He visited Rome, and was employed in some considerable works for the Cardinal de' Medici, afterwards Leo XI. He died in 1621.

Works

In Siena

Basilica of San Domenico
Mystical Marriage of St Catherine of Alexandria (1609)
Casa Mensini:
Four Evangelists (1619), fresco
Glory and Triumph of Saint Lucia (1612), fresco
Church of San Pietro a Ovile:
Famiglie di Gesù e di San Giovannino (1614)
Church of San Raimondo al Refugio:
Gesù restituisce l’abito del povero a Santa Caterina
St Catherine of Siena gives her coat to the poor
San Sebastiano:
Glory of St. Sebastian with Virtue and Angels (1606)
Convent of Santa Marta:
Santa Cecilia che suona (1615), in collaboration with Pietro Sorri
Convento delle Sperandie (Monastero delle Trafisse):
Immacolata e santi (1605)
Adoration of the Shepherds (1605), fresco
Annunciation (1605), fresco
Visitation (1605), fresco
Sant'Anna in Sant'Onofrio
Morte di Sant'Onofrio (Death of Saint Arnulf)
Palazzo Piccolomini alla Postierla (Quattro Cantoni):
Vision of St Sabinus (c. 1617)
Palazzo Pubblico
Emperor Charles V Renewing the University Privileges in Siena (Council Hall, v. 1598)
Virgin in Glory (new council hall)
Madonna and child with Angels (third hall)
Madonna of the Rosary (third hall, v. 1606)
Martyrdom of St Sebastian (third hall, v. 1606)
Pinacoteca Nazionale di Siena:
Madonna and child with St Savino (1612), 35th hall
Santa Caterina Sanctuary, Oratorio della Tintoria, frescoes (1607)
Mission of Catherine to Pope Gregory XI at Avignon
Catherine brings about Reconciliation with Florentines
Return of Catherine to Florence
Santa Maria della Scala:
St Caterina da Siena (c. 1610)

In other places
Pietà e Santi, Santa Croce church, Abbadia San SalvatoreMadonna col Bambino che consegna le chiavi a San Pietro, San Biagio church, Castiglione d'OrciaAnnunciazione (Annunciation), Lucignano Communal Museum, first hall, LucignanoMartirio di Santa Caterina d’Alessandria (Martyr of St. Catherine of Alexandria''), Santa Caterina delle Ruote (1607), Radicondoli

Notes

References

 

1568 births
1621 deaths
16th-century Italian painters
Italian male painters
17th-century Italian painters
Painters from Siena